Bath railway station may refer to one of the following railway stations in Bath, England:

Bath Green Park railway station, former Somerset & Dorset Railway station closed in 1966
Bath Spa railway station, current Great Western Main Line station
Weston railway station (Bath), former Somerset & Dorset Railway station closed in 1955